Zoar is a village within the town of Charlemont, Massachusetts in Franklin County, Massachusetts, United States on the east bank of the Deerfield River. 

The town is part of a popular recreation area for white water rafters and railroad enthusiasts. It was once served by the Hoosac Tunnel rail line of the Boston & Maine Railroad. No trains stop at Zoar in modern times. The station was torn down in 1954.  The rail line continues to be active as freight only, operated by Pan Am Railways.

References

External links
 Town of Rowe, Massachusetts
 Rowe Town Library

Villages in Franklin County, Massachusetts
Villages in Massachusetts